Byron York (born December 5, 1955) is an American conservative correspondent, pundit, columnist, and author.

Education 

York holds a B.A. from the University of Alabama at Tuscaloosa and an M.A. from the University of Chicago.

Career 

York joined The Washington Examiner as chief political correspondent in 2009. He was previously a White House correspondent for National Review. He is also a syndicated columnist. Before working for National Review, York was a news producer at CNN Headline News and an investigative reporter for The American Spectator.

He has also written for The Atlantic, The Hill, The Wall Street Journal, The Weekly Standard, and the New York Post. He has appeared on such programs as Meet the Press, The NewsHour with Jim Lehrer, The O'Reilly Factor, Meet the Press, Special Report, The Laura Ingraham Show, and Hardball with Chris Matthews, and has contributed occasional commentaries to National Public Radio. For a brief period in 2005 he was a contributing blogger at The Huffington Post. He has taken part in discussions with other media personalities at BloggingHeads.tv.

Political positions 
In 2001, York criticized President Bill Clinton's pardon of Susan McDougal, who had served three months in prison for Contempt of court related to her involvement in the Whitewater scandal.

In 2005, York posited a plot by the Democratic Party to "take down" President George W. Bush in his book The Vast Left Wing Conspiracy.

In 2007, York called on President Bush to give a full pardon to Scooter Libby, who was sentenced to prison for obstruction of justice, perjury and making false statements in the Plame affair.

In 2010, York wrote an op-ed titled "Obama has himself to blame for Muslim problem", which argued that President Obama was to blame for the widespread misconception that he was Muslim. York wrote that Obama had written about his Muslim grandfather and noted that members of his extended family were Muslim. York said that the Obama campaign had "shouted down even a measured discussion of the topic", and "to the outside observer, Obama sometimes doesn’t appear to practice any faith at all. Put it all together, and is it any wonder the public is confused?"

According to the Toronto Star, York has "[led] the inquiries into the alleged deep-state conspiracy against Trump". According to Slate, York has "[spread] conspiracy theories about the FBI." York suggested that Special Counsel Robert Mueller's probe into Russian interference in the 2016 election could be compromised because of an alleged friendship to former FBI Director James Comey, whom President Trump fired. York supported Chuck Grassley and Lindsey Graham's recommendation of criminal charges against Christopher Steele, one of the people who sought to expose Russian interference in the 2016 election. They alleged that Steele had lied to federal authorities. However, federal authorities have not filed charges against him for lying. In July 2018, when Mariia Butina, an accused Russian spy who had sought to involve herself in the NRA and the Republican Party, was arrested, York downplayed the charges.

In February 2019, York argued that the attempt by the new Democratic majority in the House of Representatives to compel the release of President Trump's tax returns amounted to the "ultimate fishing expedition".

In 2020, during the George Floyd protests against racism and police brutality, York criticized a statement by former President George W. Bush which said it was "time for America to examine our tragic failures." York said it was "remarkable" that Bush "almost completely ignored riots, violence."

Shortly before the 2020 presidential election, York wrote a piece in the Washington Examiner analyzing a findings simulation that claimed Joe Biden wouldn't concede the election if he lost, and  claiming that Biden would pressure Democratic governors to reject Trump's victory in their states and that House Democrats would refuse to acknowledge Trump's victory. He also asserted that Trump would concede if he lost. However, in reality, the opposite occurred. Trump lost the election, refused to concede, and pressured Republican governors to reject the results, all while numerous Republican officials, including in the House of Representatives, refused to acknowledge Biden's victory and voted to reject the electors.

Family and personal life
He is the son of Tom York, a longtime television personality from Birmingham, Alabama, and Helen Hamilton (born 1929). His nephew is Washington Examiner's Life and Arts editor, Park MacDougald. He is married, and plays the guitar and the mandolin.

Bibliography
 The Vast Left Wing Conspiracy: The Untold Story of How Democratic Operatives, Eccentric Billionaires, Liberal Activists, and Assorted Celebrities Tried to Bring Down a President—and Why They'll Try Even Harder Next Time (NY, Crown Forum, 2005)

References

External links
Column archive at the Washington Examiner
Column archive at National Review Online

Video debates/discussions involving York on Bloggingheads.tv

1955 births
Living people
American male bloggers
American bloggers
American investigative journalists
American political writers
The American Spectator people
National Review people
Place of birth missing (living people)
University of Alabama alumni
University of Chicago alumni
Journalists from Washington, D.C.
HuffPost writers and columnists
20th-century American journalists
American male journalists